Simon Padyham (by 1515 – 1568 or later), of New Romney, Kent, was an English politician.

He was a Member of Parliament (MP) for New Romney in March 1553 and 1558. The son of John Padyham, who was bailiff and jurat of Romney, he was also bailiff, chamberlain, and jurat to that town.

References

Year of birth uncertain
Year of death uncertain
1568 deaths
Members of Parliament for New Romney
Bailiffs
Chamberlains
Jurats
English MPs 1553 (Edward VI)
English MPs 1558